Aleksandr Gotsky (born 25 October 1947) is a Soviet long-distance runner. He competed in the marathon at the 1976 Summer Olympics.

References

1947 births
Living people
Athletes (track and field) at the 1976 Summer Olympics
Soviet male long-distance runners
Soviet male marathon runners
Olympic athletes of the Soviet Union
Place of birth missing (living people)